24th Army may refer to:

24th Army (Soviet Union)
24th Army (Wehrmacht)